Mohammad Baghdadi (born 30 October 1996) is a German professional footballer who plays as a left midfielder or left-back for German club VfV 06 Hildesheim.

Born in Germany, Baghdadi holds both German and Lebanese citizenship due to his origins, making him eligible to play for both national teams.

Club career

Eintracht Braunschweig
Baghdadi joined the youth academy of Eintracht Braunschweig in 2012 from SC Langenhagen. In 2014, he was promoted to the club's senior team. On the final matchday of the 2014–15 2. Bundesliga season, he made his professional debut for Eintracht, coming on in the 73rd minute in a match against 1. FC Union Berlin.

Bristol Rovers
On 1 July 2017, Baghdadi joined EFL League One side Bristol Rovers. On 5 January 2018, Baghdadi joined National League South side Poole Town on an initial one-month loan after spending time on loan at Southern Football League side Dorchester Town. His loan was then extended for a further month. After making seven league appearances, he then joined fellow National League South side Weston-super-Mare on loan for a month.

Baghdadi was recalled by Bristol Rovers on 10 April and made his senior debut for the club on 14 April in a 1-1 draw against Blackburn Rovers, coming on as a substitute for Byron Moore in the 77th minute.

On 16 November 2018, he joined National League South side Bath City on a one-month loan deal. 

On 25 January 2019, Baghdadi's contract with Bristol was terminated by mutual consent.

Eintracht Norderstedt
On 28 January 2019, Baghdadi joined FC Eintracht Norderstedt 03 on a contract until June 2020.

VfV 06 Hildesheim
Ahead of the 2019–20 season, Baghdadi left Eintracht Norderstedt to join VfV 06 Hildesheim.

References

External links
 
 

1996 births
Living people
Footballers from Hanover
German people of Lebanese descent
German footballers
Lebanese footballers
Association football defenders
Association football midfielders
Eintracht Braunschweig players
Eintracht Braunschweig II players
2. Bundesliga players
Regionalliga players
English Football League players
National League (English football) players
Southern Football League players
Weston-super-Mare A.F.C. players
Bristol Rovers F.C. players
Dorchester Town F.C. players
Poole Town F.C. players
Bath City F.C. players
FC Eintracht Norderstedt 03 players
VfV 06 Hildesheim players
German expatriate footballers
German expatriate sportspeople in England
Expatriate footballers in England